Tudor food is the food consumed during the Tudor period of English history, from 1485 through 1603. A common source of food during the Tudor period was bread, which was sourced from a mixture of rye and wheat. Meat was also eaten, with the poor and rich eating different types of meat. New foods were being brought from the newly discovered Americas, such as tomatoes and potatoes. The rich commonly held banquets, that consisted of a large variety of meat sources. Ale and wine were the common drinks of the time.

Food
Vegetables

The common vegetables used in the Tudor period were onions and cabbages, but nearer the end of the Tudor period, new foods were brought over from the Americas, such as tomatoes, potatoes and carrots.

Meat

The poor ate whatever meat they could find, such as rabbits, blackbirds, pheasants, partridges, hens, ducks, and pigeons, and also fish they caught from lakes and rivers. Meanwhile, the rich people also ate more costly varieties of meat, such as swan, peafowl, geese, boar, and deer (venison).

Herbs

Herbs were often used by rich Tudors to flavour their meals.  They created separate herb gardens to grow what they needed, such as parsley, mint, rosemary, thyme and sage.

Bread

Tudors of all classes consumed bread in all of their meals as the main source of carbohydrates; however, its quality varied. The cheapest bread available was Carter's bread, which was a mixture of rye and wheat. The middle class or prosperous tenants ate ravel—also known as yeoman's bread—made of wholemeal. The most expensive bread was manchet, made of white wheat flour.

Banquets and feasts 
The aristocrats held banquets and feasts consisting of different courses where each course had a variety of dishes brought out at the same time. People then could choose what they wanted to eat.

Starter 

 brawn (boar meat)
 roast tongue
 leg of pork
 roast beef
  deer 
 meat
 vegetables in season
 bread
 wine

Dinner

 roast lamb
 rabbit
 bread
 preserved fruit
 gingerbread
 sugared almonds
 deer
 fish

Beverages 
Everyone drank ale during the Tudor period, as water was considered unhealthy. Ale at the time was brewed without hops, and was not particularly alcoholic. The rich also drank wine, which was mostly imported from Europe, though some wine was produced by vineyards in Southern England. In the early 16th century, wine was expensive for most commoners, therefore an Act from 1536 decreed that wine imported from France would have a price ceiling, with those imported from Greece and especially Spain with an even higher maximum selling price.

The rich drank from wine glasses imported from Italy, which were incredibly expensive, while the poor drank from wooden goblets and cups.

Table manners 
Having clean hands was very important, as several people would dig into a common dish with their fingers. Therefore, they were advised by "Miss Manners" of the day to wash their hands out in the open where everyone could see, to make sure that they were clean. Besides that, manuals for manners from the Renaissance and Middle Ages listed some things that were frowned upon at the dinner table, including:
 Putting fingers in the ears.
 Putting hands on the heads.
 Blowing nose with the hands.
 Men were told to refrain from scratching.
 Blowing noses off or wiping off sweat with napkins.
 Poking around on a plate, probably looking for the better piece of food.
 Throwing bones on the floor. The proper place for bones was a platter.
 The release of wind.

References

Further reading

 Alison Sim (1997) Food and Feast in Tudor England. Stroud: Sutton
 Peter Brears (2003) Tudor Cookery: Recipes & History; revised. Swindon: English Heritage
Peter Brears (2015) Cooking & Dining in Tudor & Early Stuart England. Totnes: Prospect

Food
History of food and drink